The Faizan Global Relief Foundation (FGRF) is a welfare organization and working independently, and striving to help people who are suffering from catastrophes.

History 
FGRF serves in four major projects, Madani home, Green Pakistan, Faizan rehabilitation program, and disaster management department. Madani home was established in 2022, for the benefit of orphans and children who were physically or mentally challenged. The Green Pakistan initiative, started in 2021 is an ongoing project that involves plantation drives in major cities of Pakistan. The Faizan rehabilitation, which was established in January 2021, helped people after flooding in the rural areas of Sindh and Balochistan. The disaster management department provides food and medical supply in flood-stricken areas.

Achievements and collaborations 
The organization had collaborated with KMC, the local municipal department in Karachi. Both parties worked for environmental restorage in Karachi. In Pakistan, almost two million trees were planted with the help of volunteers. Apart of collaboration with Karachi’s government officials, Ministry of Punjab also showed interest to conduct operations with FGRF and other welfare organizations due to food shortage in some rural parts of the province.

Later in the beginning of 2023, a Madani healthcare center was established and inaugurated by Governor of Sindh, Kamran Tessori.

Earthquake in Turkey and Syria 
In the first week of February 2023, Turkey and Syria were hit with a dreadful earthquake, resulting in thousands of casualties. Faizan Global Relief Foundation had volunteers on the ground and anticipated an increase in the number of refugees. FGRF actively encouraged others to contribute and support them. Haji Abdul Habib Attari visited earthquake-affected areas and distributed food among the victims.

References

External links 
 Faizan Global Relief Foundation

Non-governmental organizations
Islam in Pakistan
Islam in the United Kingdom
Islamic organizations established in 1981
Sunni organizations
Islamic organisations based in Pakistan